Pixorial was a cloud-based consumer photo sharing, video sharing and video editing platform. The company was formed in 2007 in Centennial, Colorado as a media conversion service. In 2013, Pixorial was chosen as one of two video storage companies to partner with the launch of Google Drive. Pixorial allows users to edit and share videos on social channels by connecting through their Pixorial account. On June 17, 2014, Pixorial announced that its services would no longer function as of a month later, July 18, 2014.  The company has since signed a definite agreement with LifeLogger Technologies Corp. to be acquired.

History 

The company was founded in 2007 and launched in 2009 by former Netscape employee Andres Espineira. Changing its focus to video editing software in 2009, Pixorial began developing an app that would be launched for iOS and Android devices in 2011. Later developments in the app in 2012 would also included real time filters, which were later removed. With the launch of Google Drive in 2012, Pixorial was chosen as an integrated video partner. This integration with Google Drive allowed users to access videos stored in Google Drive within the web app of Pixorial. After the Google Drive launch, Pixorial developed a crowdsourced, location-based video sharing app, Krowds. The app was cited in July 2012 by PC Magazine as one of "The 8 Best Apps for Making and Sharing Videos on Your iPhone". In late July, Pixorial replaced its original mobile app with the MyPlayer HD app that optimized HD video viewing for large screen viewing including tablets and smart televisions.  Pixorial's services are no longer active as of July 18, 2014.

Products

Krowds App 

Pixorial's app was launched in April 2013 as a tool to aggregate event videos through location based collections. The app was launched to generally positive review. The application was initially launched for iOS but was followed by an Android release in May.

Movie Creator 

Launched July 12, 2012 Pixorial's Movie Creator allows users to edit movies in a simple story-telling platform Movie Creator's features include transitions, text boxes, access to free music tracks, credits, and social media sharing capabilities. The Pixorial platform allows users to view, share, and edit videos without modifying the original. Movie Creator integrates pictures and video to create user movies.

Awards 
2012 Apex Award from the Colorado Technology Association, for Best Technology Project of the Year 
2010 Computerworld Laureate for Media, Arts and Entertainment

See also 

 List of video hosting services
 Comparison of video hosting services
 List of photo-sharing websites

References 

Video editing software
Software companies based in Colorado
Companies based in Centennial, Colorado
Software companies established in 2007
Defunct software companies of the United States